Tales Schütz (born 22 August 1981 in Porto Alegre, Brazil) is a Brazilian former footballer. He is also of German ancestry.

Honours

 Hong Kong First Division League
Winner (4):  2006–07, 2007–08, 2008–09, 2009–10

 Hong Kong Senior Shield
Winner (2): 2006–07, 2009–10

Career
Schütz started his career his Brazilian club Botafogo before loan spells at Atlético Paranaense, Ashdod and Maccabi Netanya in Israel and Akratitos in Greece. Schütz also had a brief spell playing in Poland for Jagiellonia Białystok.

Hong Kong
On 14 August 2006, Schütz went on loan to Hong Kong First Division League side South China for the 2006–07 season. During his first season in Hong Kong, he obtained 3 out of the 4 Top Scorer Awards in local competition, including the main Hong Kong First Division League Top Scorer Award. He wore the No. 28 jersey in South China which represents the date on which he first met his wife. In January 2008, Schütz signed permanently on a four-year contract with South China for a transfer fee of more than HK $1 million, a record breaking fee for Hong Kong. Schutz returned to Brazil in early 2011 for injury treatment before not having his contract renewed by South China in the summer.

Azerbaijan
Following his release in the summer of 2011, Schütz moved to Azerbaijan Premier League side AZAL. After one season with AZAL, scoring 10 goals in 23 games, Schütz moved to fellow Baku based team Inter Baku where he scored twice in 15 games, both of which came in their Second qualifying round matches against Asteras Tripoli of Greece.

Return to Hong Kong
After being released by Inter Baku,
Schütz signed with Biu Chun Rangers on 19 September 2013.

Career statistics

Notes and references

External links

 
 Tales Schütz at HKFA

1981 births
Living people
Brazilian emigrants to Poland
Brazilian people of German descent
Brazilian footballers
Brazilian expatriate footballers
Association football forwards
Botafogo de Futebol e Regatas players
Club Athletico Paranaense players
F.C. Ashdod players
Maccabi Netanya F.C. players
A.P.O. Akratitos Ano Liosia players
Jagiellonia Białystok players
Clube Atlético Juventus players
Leixões S.C. players
South China AA players
Shamakhi FK players
Hong Kong Rangers FC players
Esporte Clube São José players
Primeira Liga players
Israeli Premier League players
Hong Kong First Division League players
Azerbaijan Premier League players
Expatriate footballers in Hong Kong
Expatriate footballers in Israel
Expatriate footballers in Poland
Expatriate footballers in Portugal
Expatriate footballers in Azerbaijan
Brazilian expatriate sportspeople in Hong Kong
Brazilian expatriate sportspeople in Israel
Brazilian expatriate sportspeople in Poland
Brazilian expatriate sportspeople in Portugal
Brazilian expatriate sportspeople in Azerbaijan
Hong Kong League XI representative players
Footballers from Porto Alegre